George Grice-Hutchinson (1848 - 18 May 1906) was a British Conservative politician who served as Member of Parliament for Aston Manor in Warwickshire from a by-election in 1891 to 1900, when he stood down.

References

External links 
 George Grice-Hutchinson on Hansard

1848 births
1906 deaths
Conservative Party (UK) MPs for English constituencies
UK MPs 1886–1892
UK MPs 1892–1895
UK MPs 1895–1900